Love Is Color Blind is a 2021 Filipino romantic comedy film directed by John Leo Datuin Garcia, starring Donny Pangilinan and Belle Mariano on their first film together.

The worldwide premiere was held virtually on December 9, 2021, on KTX.ph, while the worldwide release was on December 10, 2021, on various digital platforms. It became the highest-grossing film in 2021 in the Philippines.

It's also available for streaming on Netflix starting March 1, 2022.

Synopsis 
After finishing her certification course in Hong Kong, Cara (Belle Mariano) returns to the Philippines and reunites with her best friend, Ino (Donny Pangilinan), whom she’s also loved throughout the years. In seeing him again, she is shocked to see how much the tragic accident, which took his mom’s life and left him colorblind, caused him to struggle in getting on with life. To bring back the colors in the life of her artist friend, Cara helps him to paint the centerpiece in the upcoming exhibition of his late mom.

As Ino gives painting another try, he meets the gallery curator, Iris (Angelina Cruz), in whom Ino saw the color red again. As Iris helps Ino cope with his colorblindness, their gradual closeness leaves Cara heartbroken, forcing her to make a tough decision about fighting for Ino’s love. Meanwhile, Ino struggles to get past the trauma of the accident, as well as the grief that stands in the way of him opening himself to love once more.

Cast

Main cast 
 Belle Mariano as Caramel "Cara" Arevalo
 Donny Pangilinan as Domino "Ino" Urbano
 Jeremiah Lisbo as Sky
 Angelina Cruz as Iris

Supporting cast 
 Eula Valdez as Ella Villanueva-Urbano
Ariel Rivera as Fidel Urbano 
John Lapus as Tita Vicky Arevalo
Donna Cariaga as Stephi Arevalo
Arabella Davao as Ate Candy Arevalo
Reich Alim as Jam Arevalo 
Mika Pajares as Nelly
Amanda Zamora as Kimmi
Lloyd Samartino as Ninong Gary
Esnyr Ranollo as Andrei / Precious / Balong
Hyubs Azarcon as Chip Pong
 Ryan Bang as Ryan

Official soundtrack 

The official soundtrack for the series was released on December 17, 2021, and consists of tracks mostly composed by Trisha Denise and SAB.

Reception 
While still on its first day of showing, Love Is Color Blind was recognized for having the Biggest Digital Premiere and for being the Highest Grossing Movie on the digital events platform KTX.ph.

Release 
Love Is Color Blind was released globally on December 10, 2021, via iWantTFC, KTX.ph, Smart GigaPlay, Cignal Pay-Per-View, SKY Pay-Per-View, and TFC IPTV.

The film is also available to stream on Netflix beginning March 1, 2022 in selected territories.

References

External links 
 

Filipino-language films
Philippine romantic comedy films
Star Cinema films
2021 films